Elachista beriga is a moth in the family Elachistidae. It was described by Lauri Kaila in 2000.

References

Moths described in 2000
beriga